Licinus depressus is a species of beetle belonging to the family Carabidae.

References

Carabidae